The 2008 Los Angeles Angels of Anaheim season was the 48th season for the franchise. The regular season ended with the Angels winning their seventh American League West division title and setting a franchise record for single-season wins. In the postseason, they were once again defeated by the Boston Red Sox in the American League Division Series, the same team that defeated them in the 2004 and 2007 ALDS, as well as the 1986 ALCS.

General manager Bill Stoneman retired at the end of the 2007 season and was replaced by relative newcomer Tony Reagins. Reagins quickly made two headline roster moves, trading shortstop Orlando Cabrera to the Chicago White Sox for starting pitcher Jon Garland, and signing free agent outfielder Torii Hunter. Partway through the season the Angels traded first baseman Casey Kotchman to the Atlanta Braves for Mark Teixeira.

On September 10, the Angels clinched the American League West division title, their seventh in franchise history, and became the earliest team to clinch the division in its history. Three days later, closing pitcher Francisco Rodríguez broke the single-season save record with his 58th save.

Season

Standings

Record vs. opponents

Roster

April

@ Minnesota Twins – LAA won the series 3–1. The Angels won their first series of the season, mainly with excellent pitching. This was despite injuries to starters John Lackey and Kelvim Escobar and relievers Scot Shields and Chris Bootcheck. The series also marked an emotional return to Minnesota for Torii Hunter, who had moved from Minnesota to Anaheim during the off-season. In the first game, Liván Hernández out-pitched Jered Weaver to guide Minnesota to the win. In games 2 and 3, the Anaheim starting pitchers went 8 innings each. Jon Garland gave up only one run in his debut for the Angels, while Joe Saunders gave up no runs off just four hits in the longest outing of his career to date. Anaheim hit three home runs in the final game, which proved just enough to power them to a 5–4 win.
vs Texas Rangers – TEX won the series 2–1. Texas took two out of three against Anaheim, twice putting up double-digit scores. Friday night saw Texas take an 11–0 lead going into the bottom of the ninth inning, highlighted by Ben Broussard's grand slam and Josh Hamilton finishing the night a home run short of the cycle. In the bottom of the ninth, the Angels rallied for six runs. Torii Hunter, making his debut at Angel Stadium in an Angels uniform had two hits in the bottom of ninth, and the rally was ended when Garret Anderson hit a ball that was caught a few feet shy of the wall. Game 2 saw Jered Weaver beat Kevin Millwood (who lost in a complete game effort, Texas's first for 195 games.) in a pitching duel 2–1, pitching seven scoreless innings. Jon Garland struggled in his Game 3 start, giving up seven runs in five innings. Gerald Laird had a career night for the Rangers, going 4–5 with two home runs and six RBIs. Ben Broussard also went deep. Torii Hunter hit a home run for the Angels, as did Garret Anderson, his first of the season.
vs Cleveland Indians – LAA won the series 2–1. In a series with both sides boasting much speed, home runs decided all three games of the series. Game 1 saw Torii Hunter hit a dramatic walk-off Grand Slam off closer Joe Borowski, after Francisco Rodríguez blew the save in the top of the ninth. Joe Saunders went eight innings for the second time in two starts, while Fausto Carmona pitched six strong innings. Game 2 saw another blown save for the Angels. Justin Speier was called on to close, as Rodríguez was ruled out due to an ankle injury. Travis Hafner hit a two-run homer to give the winning runs to the Indians. Jake Westbrook pitched a complete game to record the win. Vladimir Guerrero hit his first home run of the season during the game. This defeat ended a 163-game winning streak for the Angels where they had been ahead after eight innings. Anaheim comfortably won game 3, courtesy of a Mike Napoli grand slam, and other home runs from Vladimir Guerrero, Garret Anderson and Casey Kotchman.
@ Seattle Mariners – SEA won the series 2–1. Raúl Ibañez stole the show in Game 1, hitting two home runs and a double, driving in three runs, chasing Jered Weaver to his second loss of the season. Game 2 saw Jon Garland struggle, conceding six runs and twelve hits in five innings. Ibanez was again on form, hitting a home run and getting three RBIs. Carlos Silva pitched eight solid innings to get the win. The final game saw the Angels offence come alive with a 16-hit attack. Howie Kendrick, Casey Kotchman and Jeff Mathis each got three hits. Cha Seung Baek was Seattle's starter, after Eric Bedard was ruled out with an inflamed left hip. Joe Saunders pitched into the sixth inning to continue his excellent start to the season.
@ Texas Rangers – LAA won the series 2–0. In the first game, Ervin Santana recovered from a three-run first inning to shut down the rangers for the next six innings to improve his record to 2–0. Jason Jennings couldn't hold the lead and went to 0–3. Game 2 saw Gary Matthews, Jr. come back to his old ball-club and hit a game winning three RBI double to seal a sweep for the Angels. Despite Michael Young's 3–5 effort, the Angels bullpen was very solid, pitching five scoreless innings. In particular, Darren Oliver pitched  innings to pick up his first win of the season.
vs Kansas City Royals – Series squared 1–1. Gil Meche and the Royals bullpen outduelled Jered Weaver to take the first game; Weaver's error to field a simple catch at first base cost a run that ended up deciding the result between the two teams. Jon Garland pitched solidly to win Game 2 for the Angels.
vs Seattle Mariners – LAA won the series 2–1. Game 1 saw Torii Hunter take all the plaudits in his effort to give the Angels the win. He went 3–4 with three doubles and three RBIs. He also made a leaping catch at the wall to deny Richie Sexson a go-ahead home run and allow Francisco Rodríguez to gain his seventh save. Ervin Santana pitched eight dominant innings in Game 2, including eight strikeouts to ensure the Angels won the series. Dustin Moseley once again struggled in Game 3, failing to pitch five innings. Miguel Batista shutout the Angels with  innings. The Angels rallied with two runs in the ninth, but this wasn't enough to come back against the Mariners.
@ Boston Red Sox – LAA won the series 2–1. This series was the first time the two teams met since the 2007 American League Division Series. The Angels bullpen failed to keep the Red Sox at bay in Game 1, as Jacoby Ellsbury hit two home runs and scored the go-ahead run in the eight to give the Red Sox the victory. Gary Matthews, Jr. hit two home runs in Game 2 behind Jon Garland's solid effort to tie the series at 1–1. Game 3 saw Joe Saunders continue his excellent start to the season, moving to 4–0. When Boston's bullpen entered the game, the Angels exploded with a four-run seventh inning to see off the Red Sox. Scot Shields attempted a two-inning save, but after giving up two runs to a David Ortiz home run in the ninth, Francisco Rodríguez was called on to get the final out to acquire his ninth save.
@ Detroit Tigers – LAA won the series 2–1. The Angels' next visit was at the resurging Detroit Tigers, who were recovering from a 0–6 start. In Game 1, Nate Robertson pitched solidly for the Tigers, apart from a four-run fourth inning, highlighted by Vladimir Guerrero's two-run home run. The Angels bullpen once again proved very solid, backing up Ervin Santana's  inning effort to secure the win.  Vladimir Guerrero hit his 2000th major league hit to break up a no-hitter from Armando Galarraga in Game 2, but it wasn't enough to stop the Tigers from winning. Game 3 featured on ESPN's Sunday Night Baseball, and saw a solid pitching performance from Jered Weaver to guide the Angels to the series victory. Torii Hunter and Casey Kotchman did the damage against Justin Verlander, each driving in three runs.
vs Oakland Athletics – Series squared 2–2. In this AL West series, Oakland started strongly, roughing up Jon Garland and Chris Bootcheck for 14 runs over  innings in a 16-hit attack. Games 2 and 3 saw young starters Joe Saunders and Ervin Santana combine for  just giving up one run, moving both pitchers to 5–0 on the season. Game 4 saw the Oakland offence light up for 15 runs off 20 hits against debutant Nick Adenhart. For the Angels, Erick Aybar hit his first home run of the season, while Mike Napoli belted his second homer of the series, his seventh of the season.

May
vs Baltimore Orioles – LAA won the series 2–1. Game 1 saw Jeremy Guthrie outduel Jered Weaver over the first seven innings. George Sherrill struggled to close the game, giving up one run, but forced Reggie Willits to pop-up to leave the bases loaded in the bottom of the ninth. Jon Garland pitched 8 strong innings in Game 2, limiting the Orioles to one run on three hits in order to earn the win for the Angels. Game 3 saw three home runs for the Angels, including a three-run homer from Torii Hunter to cap off a four-run first inning. This was enough to propel Joe Saunders to 6–0 for the season.
@ Kansas City Royals – LAA won the series 2–1. Chone Figgins was placed on the Disabled List, thus the Angels were without their speedy leadoff hitter. Game 1 saw Ervin Santana improve to 6–0 with a complete game shut-out, with 9 strikeouts. He was matched toe-to-toe for the first seven innings by Brett Tomko. A four-run top of the ninth, punctuated with a 2-RBI home run by Garret Anderson gave the Halos the victory. Garret Anderson hit 5 RBIs in Game 2, including a 3-run home run off Brian Bannister and this was all the Angels needed to win Game 2. Nick Adenhart struggled again, giving up 11 baserunners over  innings, but the bullpen shutout the Royals for the rest of the game, with Francisco Rodríguez picking up his 17th save from 18 chances. With the Angels attempting the sweep in Game 3, Jered Weaver struggled, giving 8 runs in  innings. Garret Anderson hit a home run in his third straight game, although this was not enough to stop the Royals from winning.
@ Tampa Bay Rays – TB won the series 3–0. James Shields started off the series with a one-hit shutout to give the high-flying Rays a 2–0 victory. Jon Garland matched him for eight innings, but Justin Speier gave up a two-run shot to Evan Longoria with one out in the ninth to take the loss. The Angels lost by the same score in Game 2, this time Scott Kazmir outduelled Joe Saunders to give the southpaw his first loss of the season. Former Angel Troy Percival earned his eighth save of the season. Game 3 saw the Angels score their first runs of the series, but an out-of-sorts Speier took his second loss of the series, giving up a 3-run shot to Carl Crawford in the 6th inning. The Angels 3-4-5 hitters went 7–12 with 5 RBIs, but this was not enough to topple the Rays.
vs Chicago White Sox – Series squared 2–2. In Game 1, Vladimir Guerrero hit only his fourth home run of the season to help Nick Adenhart pick up his first victory in the Majors. Jered Weaver pitched seven scoreless innings in Game 2, but John Danks matched him. However, the Angels still won courtesy of a two-run eighth inning, with RBIs from Mike Napoli and Robb Quinlan. John Lackey made his first start of the season in Game 3, pitching seven innings giving up one run, matching José Contreras's effort for the Sox. However, Scot Shields failed to record an out while giving up four runs via a Carlos Quentin grand slam in the eighth inning. Game 4 saw Francisco Rodríguez pick up his first loss of the season, giving up an RBI single in the ninth to Jim Thome, who had been hitting only .199 for the season.
vs Los Angeles Dodgers – LAA won the series 2–1. This series was the first of two Freeway series to be contested by the two teams this season. Game 1 saw Joe Saunders be the first pitcher to get to seven wins in the American League, pitching  strong innings. In Game 2, the Dodgers thwarted Ervin Santana's effort to join his teammate on seven wins, handing the young righty his first loss of the season. Offensively, Garret Anderson went 3–4, continuing his good form with the bat, he had hit .444 in his previous 12 games. The rubber game saw the Angels take the series, thanks largely to catcher Mike Napoli, who hit two home runs, got 5 RBIs and went 3–4 on the night. Maicer Izturis and Casey Kotchman also got three hits in the game.
@ Toronto Blue Jays – LAA won the series 2–1. John Lackey picked up his first win of the season in Game 1, pitching seven strong innings. Francisco Rodríguez got his league-leading 18th save, despite giving up three walks in the ninth. Shawn Marcum felt the full force of Vladimir Guerrero's bat in Game 2, the slugger hit two home runs and got all 4 RBIs to ensure the Angels took the series with a game to spare. Game 3 saw Lyle Overbay hit a solo home run in the sixth inning to hand Ervin Santana his second consecutive loss by breaking a 3–3 tie.
@ Chicago White Sox – LAA won the series 2–1. Los Angeles entered Chicago with the White Sox on a seven-game winning streak. Joe Saunders overcame sickness to end the streak, pitching  innings of one-run ball, which was enough to beat Gavin Floyd's complete game effort. Game 2 saw another low-scoring affair, this time Jered Weaver twirled eight scoreless innings, assisted by Vladimir Guerrero's seventh home run of the season. In the final game, John Lackey pitched into the ninth inning, following the efforts of Saunders and Weaver before him. However, his complete game effort was ended by Carlos Quentin's second home run of the night, as the slugger drove in all three RBIs to give the White Sox the victory behind José Contreras' eight-inning effort.
vs Detroit Tigers – LAA won the series 2–1. Game 1 saw both offences stifled, both teams hitting a combined 0–24 with runners in scoring position. In the 12th inning, Garret Anderson drew a bases-loaded walk to give José Arredondo his first win of his major-league career. Miguel Cabrera's 8th home run of the season was the only blemish on Ervin Santana's complete game in Game 2, but he still picked up the victory, after Garret Anderson's 3–4 night and Gary Matthews, Jr.'s walk-off single. Joe Saunders struggled in the final game, giving up two home runs and four RBIs to Marcus Thames. Armando Galarraga continued his excellent start to his rookie season, pitching into the ninth inning and picking up the win.
vs Toronto Blue Jays – LAA won the series 2–1. Lyle Overbay went 3–5 with two home runs and three RBIs to knock Jered Weaver out early, and highlighted a 10-run, 16-hit attack to beat the Angels in Game 1. John Lackey once again pitched into the eight inning in Game 2, but failed to get a decision despite the Angels getting 16 hits, including Maicer Izturis' 4–5 effort. In the end, Juan Rivera hit a walk-off single in the 10th to beat Blue Jays. In the rubber game, A. J. Burnett's eight-inning effort was wasted by B. J. Ryan's inability to close the game. He hit Howie Kendrick to force in the tying run, and Maicer Izturis singled in the winning run to give the Angels their fifth consecutive series win. Sean Rodriguez had earlier hit his first ever Major League home run to put the only runs up against Burnett.

Playoffs
The Angels beat the New York Yankees 4 to 2 on September 10, 2008 and about an hour later Seattle beat Texas which clinched the division for the Angels. With the Boston Red Sox securing the AL Wild Card, the Angels would have to face their old foes in the first round of the playoffs once again. The Red Sox swept the Angels in the division series in 2007 and 2004, but failed to do so in 2008.

 ALDS Game One
John Lackey gave up a 2-run homer to Jason Bay in the top of the sixth letting Boston take a lead they would not relinquish. Boston went on to win 4 to 2 marking the 10th straight playoff game the Angels lost to Boston. People now refer to this as the curse of Donnie Moore.

Game log

|- align="center" bgcolor="ffbbbb"
| 1 || March 31 || @ Twins  || 3–2 ||Hernández (1–0)||Weaver (0–1) ||Nathan (1) || HHH Metrodome || 49,596 || 0–1 || bgcolor="ffbbbb" | -1
|-

|- align="center" bgcolor="#bbffbb"
| 2 || April 1 || @ Twins  || 9–1 || Garland (1–0) || Bonser (0–1) || || HHH Metrodome || 24,586 || 1–1 || bgcolor="f2f2f2" | 0
|- align="center" bgcolor="#bbffbb"
| 3 || April 2 || @ Twins  || 1–0 || Saunders (1–0) || Blackburn (0–1) || Rodríguez (1) || HHH Metrodome || 21,932 || 2–1 || bgcolor="f2f2f2" | 0
|- align="center" bgcolor="#bbffbb"
| 4 || April 3 || @ Twins  || 5–4 || Santana (1–0) || Slowey (0–1) ||  Rodríguez (2) || HHH Metrodome || 17,084 || 3–1 || bgcolor="bbffbb" | +½
|- align="center" bgcolor="ffbbbb"
| 5 || April 4 || Rangers  || 11–6 || Gabbard (1–0) || Moseley (0–1) || || Angel Stadium of Anaheim || 43,838 || 3–2 || bgcolor="bbffbb" | +½
|- align="center" bgcolor="bbffbb"
| 6 || April 5 || Rangers || 2–1 || Weaver (1–1) || Millwood (0–2) || Rodríguez (3) || Angel Stadium of Anaheim || 41,170|| 4–2 || bgcolor="bbffbb" | +1
|- align="center" bgcolor="ffbbbb"
| 7 || April 6 || Rangers || 10–4 || Padilla (1–0) || Garland (1–1) || || Angel Stadium of Anaheim || 39,242 || 4–3 || bgcolor="bbffbb" | +½
|- align="center" bgcolor="bbffbb"
| 8 || April 7 || Indians || 6–4 || Shields (1–0) || Borowski (0–1) || || Angel Stadium of Anaheim || 35,014 || 5–3 || bgcolor="bbffbb" | +1
|- align="center" bgcolor="ffbbbb"
| 9 || April 8 || Indians || 4–3 || Westbrook (1–1) || Speier (0–1) || || Angel Stadium of Anaheim || 37,587 || 5–4 || bgcolor="bbffbb" | +½
|- align="center" bgcolor="bbffbb"
| 10 || April 9 || Indians || 9–5 || Moseley (1–1) || Byrd (0–2) || || Angel Stadium of Anaheim || 36,168 || 6–4 || bgcolor="bbffbb" | +½
|- align="center" bgcolor="ffbbbb"
| 11 || April 11 || @ Mariners || 8–5 || Hernández (1–0) || Weaver (1–2) || Lowe (1) || Safeco Field || 28,915 || 6–5 || bgcolor="ffbbbb" | -1
|- align="center" bgcolor="ffbbbb"
| 12 || April 12 || @ Mariners || 8–3 || Silva (2–0) || Garland (1–2) || || Safeco Field || 34,963 || 6–6 || bgcolor="ffbbbb" | -2
|- align="center" bgcolor="bbffbb"
| 13 || April 13 || @ Mariners || 10–5 || Saunders (2–0) || Baek (0–1) || || Safeco Field || 30,664 || 7–6 || bgcolor="ffbbbb" | -1
|- align="center" bgcolor="bbffbb"
| 14 || April 14 || @ Rangers || 7–4 || Santana (2–0) || Jennings (0–3) || Rodríguez (4) || Rangers Ballpark in Arlington || 16,541 || 8–6 || bgcolor="ffbbbb" | -1
|- align="center" bgcolor="bbffbb"
| 15 || April 15 || @ Rangers || 7–4 || Oliver (1–0) || Rupe (0–1) || Rodríguez (5) || Rangers Ballpark in Arlington || 15,595 || 9–6 || bgcolor="f2f2f2" | 0
|- align="center" bgcolor="ffbbbb"
| 16 || April 16 || Royals  || 3–2 || Meche (1–2) || Weaver (1–3) || Soria (5) || Angel Stadium of Anaheim || 41,336 || 9–7 || bgcolor="f2f2f2" | 0
|- align="center" bgcolor="bbffbb"
| 17 || April 17 || Royals  || 5–3  || Garland (2–2) || Tomko (1–2) || Rodríguez (6) || Angel Stadium of Anaheim || 40,021 || 10–7 || bgcolor="bbffbb" | +1
|- align="center" bgcolor="bbffbb"
| 18 || April 18 || Mariners || 5–4 || Saunders (3–0) || Dickey (0–1) || Rodríguez (7) || Angel Stadium of Anaheim || 43,939 || 11–7 || bgcolor="bbffbb" | +1
|- align="center" bgcolor="bbffbb"
| 19 || April 19 || Mariners || 4–1 || Santana (3–0) || Washburn (1–3) || Shields (1) || Angel Stadium of Anaheim || 43,959 || 12–7 || bgcolor="bbffbb" | +1
|- align="center" bgcolor="ffbbbb"
| 20 || April 20 || Mariners || 4–2 || Batista (2–2) || Moseley (1–2) || Rowland-Smith (2) || Angel Stadium of Anaheim || 43,631 || 12–8 || bgcolor="f2f2f2" | 0
|- align="center" bgcolor="ffbbbb"
| 21 || April 22 || @ Red Sox || 7–6 || Timlin (2–1)|| Oliver (1–1) || Papelbon (8) || Fenway Park || 37,982 || 12–9 || bgcolor="f2f2f2" | 0
|- align="center" bgcolor="bbffbb"
| 22 || April 23 || @ Red Sox || 6–4 || Garland (3–2) || Hansen (0–1) || Rodríguez (8) || Fenway Park || 38,172 || 13–9 || bgcolor="f2f2f2" | 0
|- align="center" bgcolor="bbffbb"
| 23 || April 24 || @ Red Sox || 7–5 || Saunders (4–0) || Delcarmen (0–1) || Rodríguez (9) || Fenway Park || 37,848 || 14–9 || bgcolor="f2f2f2" | 0
|- align="center" bgcolor="bbffbb"
| 24 || April 25 || @ Tigers || 4–3 || Santana (4–0) || Robertson (0–3) || Rodríguez (10) || Comerica Park || 40,380 || 15–9 || bgcolor="f2f2f2" | 0
|- align="center" bgcolor="ffbbbb"
| 25 || April 26 || @ Tigers || 6–4 || López (2–0) || O'Day (0–1) || Jones (4) || Comerica Park || 42,068 || 15–10 || bgcolor="f2f2f2" | 0
|- align="center" bgcolor="bbffbb"
| 26 || April 27 || @ Tigers || 6–2 || Weaver (2–3) || Verlander (1–4) || || Comerica Park || 36,347 || 16–10 || bgcolor="f2f2f2" | 0
|- align="center" bgcolor="ffbbbb"
| 27 || April 28 || Athletics || 14–2 || Gaudin (3–1) || Garland (3–3) || || Angel Stadium of Anaheim || 37,725 || 16–11 || bgcolor="ffbbbb" | -1
|- align="center" bgcolor="bbffbb"
| 28 || April 29 || Athletics || 2–0 || Saunders (5–0) || Smith (1–2) || Rodríguez (11) || Angel Stadium of Anaheim || 35,764 || 17–11 || bgcolor="f2f2f2" | 0
|- align="center" bgcolor="bbffbb"
| 29 || April 30 || Athletics || 6–1 || Santana (5–0) || Eveland (3–2) || || Angel Stadium of Anaheim || 35,301 || 18–11 || bgcolor="bbffbb" | +1
|-

|- align="center" bgcolor="ffbbbb"
| 30 || May 1 || Athletics  || 15–8 || Duchscherer (2–1) || Moseley (1–3) || || Angel Stadium of Anaheim || 37,396 || 18–12 ||  bgcolor="f2f2f2" | 0
|- align="center" bgcolor="ffbbbb"
| 31 || May 2 || Orioles  || 4–3 || Guthrie (1–3) || Weaver (2–4) || Sherrill (11) || Angel Stadium of Anaheim || 41,515 || 18–13 ||  bgcolor="f2f2f2" | 0
|- align="center" bgcolor="bbffbb"
| 32 || May 3 || Orioles  || 3–1 || Garland (4–3) || Cabrera (2–1) || Rodríguez (12) || Angel Stadium of Anaheim || 37,601 || 19–13 || bgcolor="bbffbb" | +1
|- align="center" bgcolor="bbffbb"
| 33 || May 4 || Orioles || 6–5 || Saunders (6–0) || Trachsel (1–4) || Rodríguez (13) || Angel Stadium of Anaheim || 39,273 || 20–13 || bgcolor="bbffbb" | +1
|- align="center" bgcolor="bbffbb"
| 34 || May 5 || @ Royals || 4–0 || Santana (6–0) || R. Ramírez (0–1) || || Kauffman Stadium || 12,157 || 21–13 || bgcolor="bbffbb" | +1
|- align="center" bgcolor="bbffbb"
| 35 || May 6 || @ Royals || 5–3 || Oliver (2–1) || Bannister (3–4) || Rodríguez (14) || Kauffman Stadium || 11,354 || 22–13 || bgcolor="bbffbb" | +1
|- align="center" bgcolor="ffbbbb"
| 36 || May 7 || @ Royals || 9–4 || Greinke (4–1) || Weaver (2–5) || || Kauffman Stadium || 11,084 || 22–14 || bgcolor="f2f2f2" | 0
|- align="center" bgcolor="ffbbbb"
| 37 || May 9 || @ Rays || 2–0 || Shields (4–2) || Speier (0–2) || || Tropicana Field || 12,039 || 22–15 || bgcolor="f2f2f2" | 0
|- align="center" bgcolor="ffbbbb"
| 38 || May 10 || @ Rays || 2–0 || Kazmir (1–1) || Saunders (6–1) || Percival (8) || Tropicana Field || 25,512 || 22–16 || bgcolor="f2f2f2" | 0
|- align="center" bgcolor="ffbbbb"
| 39 || May 11 || @ Rays || 8–5 || Howell (2–0) || Speier (0–3) || Percival (9) || Tropicana Field || 13,010 || 22–17 || bgcolor="ffbbbb" | -1
|- align="center" bgcolor="bbffbb"
| 40 || May 12 || White Sox || 10–7 || Adenhart (1–0) || Buehrle (1–5) || Rodríguez (15) || Angel Stadium of Anaheim || 38,723 || 23–17 || bgcolor="ffbbbb" | -½
|- align="center" bgcolor="bbffbb"
| 41 || May 13 || White Sox || 2–0 || Shields (2–0) || Dotel (1–2) || Rodríguez (16) || Angel Stadium of Anaheim || 35,333 || 24–17 || bgcolor="bbffbb" | +½
|- align="center" bgcolor="ffbbbb"
| 42 || May 14 || White Sox || 6–1 || Contreras (4–3) || Shields (2–1) || || Angel Stadium of Anaheim || 37,059 || 24–18 || bgcolor="bbffbb" | +½
|- align="center" bgcolor="ffbbbb"
| 43 || May 15 || White Sox || 4–3 || Dotel (2–2) || Rodríguez (0–1) || Jenks (8) || Angel Stadium of Anaheim || 41,444 || 24–19 || bgcolor="bbffbb" | +½
|- align="center" bgcolor="bbffbb"
| 44 || May 16 || Dodgers || 4–2 || Saunders (7–1) || Kuroda (1–3) || Rodríguez (17) || Angel Stadium of Anaheim || 44,047 || 25–19 || bgcolor="bbffbb" | +1½
|- align="center" bgcolor="ffbbbb"
| 45 || May 17 || Dodgers || 6–3 || Kuo (3–1) || Santana (6–1) || || Angel Stadium of Anaheim || 43,906 || 25–20 || bgcolor="bbffbb" | +½
|- align="center" bgcolor="bbffbb"
| 46 || May 18 || Dodgers || 10–2 || Weaver (3–5) || Lowe (2–4) || || Angel Stadium of Anaheim || 44,007 || 26–20 || bgcolor="bbffbb" | +1½
|- align="center" bgcolor="bbffbb"
| 47 || May 20 || @ Blue Jays || 3–1 || Lackey (1–0) || McGowan (2–4) || Rodríguez (18) || Rogers Centre || 31,487 || 27–20 || bgcolor="bbffbb" | +3
|- align="center" bgcolor="bbffbb"
| 48 || May 21 || @ Blue Jays || 4–3 || Garland (5–3) || Marcum (4–3) || Rodríguez (19) || Rogers Centre || 20,163 || 28–20 || bgcolor="bbffbb" | +3
|- align="center" bgcolor="ffbbbb"
| 49 || May 22 || @ Blue Jays || 4–3 || Burnett (5–4) || Santana (6–2) || Ryan (10) || Rogers Centre || 22,007 || 28–21 || bgcolor="bbffbb" | +2½
|- align="center" bgcolor="bbffbb"
| 50 || May 23 || @ White Sox || 3–1 || Saunders (8–1) || Floyd (4–3) || Rodríguez (20) || U.S. Cellular Field || 28,156 || 29–21 || bgcolor="bbffbb" | +2½
|- align="center" bgcolor="bbffbb"
| 51 || May 24 || @ White Sox || 2–0 || Weaver (4–5) || Danks (3–4) || Rodríguez (21) || U.S. Cellular Field || 38,434 || 30–21 || bgcolor="bbffbb" | +2½
|- align="center" bgcolor="ffbbbb"
| 52 || May 25 || @ White Sox || 3–2 || Linebrink (2–0) || Lackey (1–1) || || U.S. Cellular Field || 36,195 || 30–22 || bgcolor="bbffbb" | +1½
|- align="center" bgcolor="bbffbb"
| 53 || May 26 || Tigers || 1–0 (12) || Arredondo (1–0) || Dolsi (0–1) || || Angel Stadium of Anaheim || 41,031 || 31–22 || bgcolor="bbffbb" | +2
|- align="center" bgcolor="bbffbb"
| 54 || May 27 || Tigers || 3–2 || Santana (7–2) || López (2–1) || || Angel Stadium of Anaheim || 36,569 || 32–22 || bgcolor="bbffbb" | +2
|- align="center" bgcolor="ffbbbb"
| 55 || May 28 || Tigers || 6–2 || Galarraga (4–2) || Saunders (8–2) || || Angel Stadium of Anaheim || 42,191 || 32–23 || bgcolor="bbffbb" | +2
|- align="center" bgcolor="ffbbbb"
| 56 || May 30 || Blue Jays || 10–4 || McGowan (4–4) || Weaver (4–6) || || Angel Stadium of Anaheim || 42,577 || 32–24 || bgcolor="bbffbb" | +2½
|- align="center" bgcolor="bbffbb"
| 57 || May 31 || Blue Jays || 3–2(10) || Shields (3–1) || Tallet (0–1) || || Angel Stadium of Anaheim || 43,645 || 33–24 || bgcolor="bbffbb" | +3½
|-

|- align="center" bgcolor="bbffbb"
| 58 || June 1 || Blue Jays || 4–3 || Arredondo (2–0) || Ryan (1–1) || || Angel Stadium of Anaheim || 40,026 || 34–24 || bgcolor="bbffbb" | +3½
|- align="center" bgcolor="bbffbb"
| 59 || June 2 || @ Mariners || 4–2 || Santana (8–2) || Washburn (2–7) || Rodríguez (22) || Safeco Field || 22,110 || 35–24 || bgcolor="bbffbb" | +3½
|- align="center" bgcolor="bbffbb"
| 60 || June 3 || @ Mariners || 5–4 || Saunders (9–2) || Bedard (4–4) || Rodríguez (23) || Safeco Field || 23,354 || 36–24 || bgcolor="bbffbb" | +3½
|- align="center" bgcolor="bbffbb"
| 61 || June 4 || @ Mariners || 5–4 || Weaver (5–6) || Silva (3–6) || Rodríguez (24) || Safeco Field || 32,774 || 37–24 || bgcolor="bbffbb" | +3½
|- align="center" bgcolor="bbffbb"
| 62 || June 6 || @ Athletics || 3–1 || Lackey (2–1) || Blanton (3–8) || Rodríguez (25) || McAfee Coliseum || 25,120 || 38–24 || bgcolor="bbffbb" | +4½
|- align="center" bgcolor="bbffbb"
| 63 || June 7 || @ Athletics || 5–3 || Garland (6–3) || Smith (3–5) || Rodríguez (26) || McAfee Coliseum || 29,294 || 39–24 || bgcolor="bbffbb" | +5½
|- align="center" bgcolor="ffbbbb"
| 64 || June 8 || @ Athletics || 7–3 (12) || Ziegler (1–0) || Bootcheck (0–1) || || McAfee Coliseum || 26,332 || 39–25 || bgcolor="bbffbb" | +4½
|- align="center" bgcolor="ffbbbb"
| 65 || June 9 || Rays || 13–4 || Jackson (4–5) || Saunders (9–3) || || Angel Stadium of Anaheim || 42,019 || 39–26 || bgcolor="bbffbb" | +4
|- align="center" bgcolor="bbffbb"
| 66 || June 10 || Rays || 6–1 || Weaver (6–6) || Shields (4–5) || || Angel Stadium of Anaheim || 37,610 || 40–26 || bgcolor="bbffbb" | +5
|- align="center" bgcolor="bbffbb"
| 67 || June 11 || Rays || 4–2 || Lackey (3–1) || Kazmir (6–2) || Rodríguez (27) || Angel Stadium of Anaheim || 36,622 || 41–26 || bgcolor="bbffbb" | +5
|- align="center" bgcolor="ffbbbb"
| 68 || June 13 || Braves || 5–2 || Reyes (3–4) || Garland (6–4) || Bennett (2) || Angel Stadium of Anaheim || 43,919 || 41–27 || bgcolor="bbffbb" | +4½
|- align="center" bgcolor="ffbbbb"
| 69 || June 14 || Braves || 9–4 || Morton (1–0) || Santana (8–3) || || Angel Stadium of Anaheim || 43,894 || 41–28 || bgcolor="bbffbb" | +3½
|- align="center" bgcolor="bbffbb"
| 70 || June 15 || Braves || 2–0 || Saunders (10–3) || Campillo (2–1) || Rodríguez (28) || Angel Stadium of Anaheim || 43,723 || 41–29 || bgcolor="bbffbb" | +3½
|- align="center" bgcolor="ffbbbb"
| 71 || June 16 || Mets || 9–6 || Pelfrey (3–6) || Weaver (6–7) || Wagner (15) || Angel Stadium of Anaheim || 39,229 || 42–29 || bgcolor="bbffbb" | +3
|- align="center" bgcolor="bbffbb"
| 72 || June 17 || Mets || 6–1 || Lackey (4–1) || Santana (7–5) || Shields (2) || Angel Stadium of Anaheim || 40,122 || 43–29 || bgcolor="bbffbb" | +3
|- align="center" bgcolor="ffbbbb"
| 73 || June 18 || Mets || 5–4 (10) || Sánchez (3–0) || Speier (0–4) || Wagner (16) || Angel Stadium of Anaheim || 43,138 || 43–30 || bgcolor="bbffbb" | +3
|- align="center" bgcolor="bbffbb"
| 74 || June 20 || @ Phillies || 7–1 || Santana (9–3) || Eaton (2–5) || || Citizens Bank Park || 45,033 || 44–30 || bgcolor="bbffbb" | +3½
|- align="center" bgcolor="bbffbb"
| 75 || June 21 || @ Phillies || 6–2 || Saunders (11–3) || Myers (3–9) || Rodríguez (29)|| Citizens Bank Park || 45,196 || 45–30 || bgcolor="bbffbb" | +4½
|- align="center" bgcolor="bbffbb"
| 76 || June 22 || @ Phillies || 3–2 || Weaver (7–7) || Hamels (7–5) || Rodríguez (30) || Citizens Bank Park || 44,571 || 46–30 || bgcolor="bbffbb" | +4½
|- align="center" bgcolor="bbffbb"
| 77 || June 23 || @ Nationals || 3–2 || Lackey (5–1) || Rivera (3–4) || Rodríguez (31) || Nationals Park || 24,805 || 47–30 || bgcolor="bbffbb" | +5
|- align="center" bgcolor="bbffbb"
| 78 || June 24 || @ Nationals || 8–3 || Garland (7–4) || Hill (1–5) || || Nationals Park || 28,351 || 48–30 || bgcolor="bbffbb" | +5
|- align="center" bgcolor="ffbbbb"
| 79 || June 25 || @ Nationals || 5–4 || Rauch (4–1) || Shields (3–2) || || Nationals Park || 29,180 || 48–31 || bgcolor="bbffbb" | +5
|- align="center" bgcolor="ffbbbb"
| 80 || June 27 || @ Dodgers || 6–0 || Park (3–2) || Saunders (11–4) || || Dodger Stadium || 50,419 || 48–32 || bgcolor="bbffbb" | +3½
|- align="center" bgcolor="ffbbbb"
| 81 || June 28 || @ Dodgers || 1–0 || Billingsley (7–7) || Weaver (7–8) || Saito (12) || Dodger Stadium || 55,784 || 48–33 || bgcolor="bbffbb" | +3½
|- align="center" bgcolor="bbffbb"
| 82 || June 29 || @ Dodgers || 1–0 || Lackey (6–1) || Lowe (5–8) || Rodríguez (32) || Dodger Stadium || 48,155 || 49–33 || bgcolor="bbffbb" | +4½
|- align="center" bgcolor="ffbbbb"
| 83 || June 30 || Athletics || 6–1 || Smith (5–6) || Garland (7–5) || || Angel Stadium of Anaheim || 42,046 || 49–34 || bgcolor="bbffbb" | +12½
|-

|- align="center" bgcolor="bbffbb"
| 84 || July 1 || Athletics || 6–5 || Shields (4–2) || Embree (1–3) || Rodríguez (33) || Angel Stadium of Anaheim || 42,047 || 50–34 || bgcolor="bbffbb" | +4½
|- align="center" bgcolor="bbffbb"
| 85 || July 2 || Athletics || 7–4 || Saunders (12–4) || Foulke (0–3) || Rodríguez (34) || Angel Stadium of Anaheim || 41,091 || 51–34 || bgcolor="bbffbb" | +5½
|- align="center" bgcolor="bbffbb"
| 86 || July 4 || Blue Jays || 8–2 || Weaver (8–8) || Burnett (8–8) || || Angel Stadium of Anaheim || 44,021 || 52–34 || bgcolor="bbffbb" | +5
|- align="center" bgcolor="ffbbbb"
| 87 || July 5 || Blue Jays || 7–5 || Halladay (10–4) || Lackey (6–2) || || Angel Stadium of Anaheim || 43,767 || 52–35 || bgcolor="bbffbb" | +5
|- align="center" bgcolor="bbffbb"
| 88 || July 6 || Blue Jays || 7–1 || Garland (8–5) || Litsch (8–5) || || Angel Stadium of Anaheim || 41,026 || 53–35 || bgcolor="bbffbb" | +6
|- align="center" bgcolor="bbffbb"
| 89 || July 7 || @ Rangers || 9–6 || Santana (10–3) || Mendoza (1–3) || Rodríguez (35) || Rangers Ballpark in Arlington || 21,170 || 54–35 || bgcolor="bbffbb" | +6
|- align="center" bgcolor="ffbbbb"
| 90 || July 8 || @ Rangers || 3–2 || Harrison (1–0) || Saunders (12–5) || Wilson (22) || Rangers Ballpark in Arlington || 18,788 || 54–36 || bgcolor="bbffbb" | +5
|- align="center" bgcolor="ffbbbb"
| 91 || July 9 || @ Rangers || 5–4 || Wright (5–3) || Rodríguez (0–2) || || Rangers Ballpark in Arlington || 24,515 || 54–37 || bgcolor="bbffbb" | +5
|- align="center" bgcolor="bbffbb"
| 92 || July 10 || @ Rangers || 11-10 (11) || Speier (1–4) || Wright (5–4) || Rodríguez (36) || Rangers Ballpark in Arlington || 23,262 || 55–37 || bgcolor="bbffbb" | +5
|- align="center" bgcolor="ffbbbb"
| 93 || July 11 || @ Athletics || 9–2 || Gallagher (4–4) || Garland (8–6) || || McAfee Coliseum || 31,372 || 55–38 || bgcolor="bbffbb" | +4
|- align="center" bgcolor="bbffbb"
| 94 || July 12 || @ Athletics || 4–1 || Santana (11–3) || Eveland (7–6) || Rodríguez (37) || McAfee Coliseum || 27,161 || 56–38 || bgcolor="bbffbb" | +5
|- align="center" bgcolor="bbffbb"
| 95 || July 13 || @ Athletics || 4–3 || Arredondo (3–0) || Street (2–3) || Rodríguez (38) || McAfee Coliseum || 29,352 || 57–38 || bgcolor="bbffbb" | +6
|- align="center" bgcolor="bbcaff"
|colspan="4" bgcolor="#bbcaff"| July 15: All-Star Game (AL wins, 4–3)  || Kazmir (TB) || Lidge (PHI) ||  || Yankee Stadium || 55,632 || colspan=2 | New York City
|- align="center" bgcolor="bbffbb"
| 96 || July 18 || Red Sox || 11–3 || Lackey (7–2) || Buchholz (2–5) || || Angel Stadium of Anaheim || 44,260 || 58–38 || bgcolor="bbffbb" | +7
|- align="center" bgcolor="bbffbb"
| 97 || July 19 || Red Sox || 4–2 || Arredondo (4–0) || Beckett (9–6) || Rodríguez (39) || Angel Stadium of Anaheim || 44,005 || 59–38 || bgcolor="bbffbb" | +8
|- align="center" bgcolor="bbffbb"
| 98 || July 20 || Red Sox || 5–3 || Oliver (3–1) || Wakefield (6–7) || Rodríguez (40) || Angel Stadium of Anaheim || 44,164 || 60–38 || bgcolor="bbffbb" | +9
|- align="center" bgcolor="ffbbbb"
| 99 || July 21 || Indians || 5–2 || Byrd (4–10) || Santana (11–4) || Kobayashi (6) || Angel Stadium of Anaheim || 43,037 || 60–39 || bgcolor="bbffbb" | +8½
|- align="center" bgcolor="bbffbb"
| 100 || July 22 || Indians || 3–2 || Oliver (4–1) || Ginter (1–1) || Rodríguez (41) || Angel Stadium of Anaheim || 43,505 || 61–39 || bgcolor="bbffbb" | +9
|- align="center" bgcolor="bbffbb"
| 101 || July 23 || Indians || 14–11 || Lackey (8–2) || Laffey (5–7) || Rodríguez (42) || Angel Stadium of Anaheim || 42,187 || 62–39 || bgcolor="bbffbb" | +10
|- align="center" bgcolor="bbffbb"
| 102 || July 25 || @ Orioles || 6–5 || Saunders (13–5) || Burres (7–7) || Rodríguez (43) || Oriole Park at Camden Yards || 27,999 || 63–39 || bgcolor="bbffbb" | +10½
|- align="center" bgcolor="bbffbb"
| 103 || July 26 || @ Orioles || 11–6 || Garland (9–6) || Liz (4–3) || || Oriole Park at Camden Yards || 21,819 || 64–39 || bgcolor="bbffbb" | +10½
|- align="center" bgcolor="ffbbbb"
| 104 || July 27 || @ Orioles || 5–2 || Olson (7–5) || Santana (11–5) || Sherrill (30) || Oriole Park at Camden Yards || 23,365 || 64–40 || bgcolor="bbffbb" | +10½
|- align="center" bgcolor="bbffbb"
| 105 || July 28 || @ Red Sox || 7–5 || Weaver (9–8) || Matsuzaka (11–2) || Rodríguez (44) || Fenway Park || 37,830 || 65–40 || bgcolor="bbffbb" | +11½
|- align="center" bgcolor="bbffbb"
| 106 || July 29 || @ Red Sox || 6–2 || Lackey (9–2) || Buchholz (2–6) || || Fenway Park || 38,110 || 66–40 || bgcolor="bbffbb" | +11½
|- align="center" bgcolor="bbffbb"
| 107 || July 30 || @ Red Sox || 9–2 || Saunders (14–5) || Beckett (9–8) || || Fenway Park || 38,042 || 67–40 || bgcolor="bbffbb" | +11½
|- align="center" bgcolor="bbffbb"
| 108 || July 31 || @ Yankees || 12–6 || Garland (10–6) || Pettitte (12–8) || || Yankee Stadium || 53,405 || 68–40 || bgcolor="bbffbb" | +12½
|-

|- align="center" bgcolor="bbffbb"
| 109 || August 1 || @ Yankees || 1–0 || Santana (12–5) || Rivera (4–4) || Rodríguez (45) || Yankee Stadium || 53,997 || 69–40 || bgcolor="bbffbb" | +12½
|- align="center" bgcolor="ffbbbb"
| 110 || August 2 || @ Yankees || 9–2 || Mussina (14–6) || Weaver (9–9) || || Yankee Stadium || 54,170 || 69–41 || bgcolor="bbffbb" | +12½
|- align="center" bgcolor="ffbbbb"
| 111 || August 3 || @ Yankees || 14–9 || E. Ramírez (3–0) || Shields (4–3) || || Yankee Stadium || 54,204 || 69–42 || bgcolor="bbffbb" | +11½
|- align="center" bgcolor="bbffbb"
| 112 || August 4 || Orioles || 6–5 || Rodríguez (1–2) || Sherrill (3–5) || || Angel Stadium of Anaheim || 41,902 || 70–42 || bgcolor="bbffbb" | +11½
|- align="center" bgcolor="ffbbbb"
| 113 || August 5 || Orioles || 3–0 || Waters (1–0) || Garland (10–7) || Sherrill (31) || Angel Stadium of Anaheim || 44,027 || 70–43 || bgcolor="bbffbb" | +10½
|- align="center" bgcolor="bbffbb"
| 114 || August 6 || Orioles || 9–4 || Santana (13–5) || Olson (8–6) || || Angel Stadium of Anaheim || 40,130 || 71–43 || bgcolor="bbffbb" | +11½
|- align="center" bgcolor="bbffbb"
| 115 || August 8 || Yankees || 10–5 || Weaver (10–9) || Kennedy (0–4) || || Angel Stadium of Anaheim || 44,158 || 72–43 || bgcolor="bbffbb" | +13
|- align="center" bgcolor="bbffbb"
| 116 || August 9 || Yankees || 11–4 || Shields (5–3) || E. Ramírez (3–1) || || Angel Stadium of Anaheim || 43,919 || 73–43 || bgcolor="bbffbb" | +14
|- align="center" bgcolor="bbffbb"
| 117 || August 10 || Yankees || 4–3 || Rodríguez (2–2) || Marte (4–2) || || Angel Stadium of Anaheim || 44,138 || 74–43 || bgcolor="bbffbb" | +14
|- align="center" bgcolor="bbffbb"
| 118 || August 12 || Mariners || 7–3 || Garland (11–7) || Washburn (5–12) || Rodríguez (46) || Angel Stadium of Anaheim || 42,086 || 75–43 || bgcolor="bbffbb" | +15
|- align="center" bgcolor="ffbbbb"
| 119 || August 13 || Mariners || 10–7 (12) || Corcoran (3–0) || Speier (1–5) || || Angel Stadium of Anaheim || 42,754 || 75–44 || bgcolor="bbffbb" | +15
|- align="center" bgcolor="ffbbbb"
| 120 || August 15 || @ Indians || 3–2 || Lee (17–2) || Arredondo (4–1) || || Progressive Field || 30,962 || 75–45 || bgcolor="bbffbb" | +15½
|- align="center" bgcolor="bbffbb"
| 121 || August 16 || @ Indians || 4–3 || Lackey (10–2) || Carmona (5–5) || Rodríguez (47) || Progressive Field || 33,051 || 76–45 || bgcolor="bbffbb" | +15½
|- align="center" bgcolor="ffbbbb"
| 122 || August 17 || @ Indians || 4–3 || Sowers (2–6) || Speier (1–6) || Lewis (3) || Progressive Field || 28,356 || 76–46 || bgcolor="bbffbb" | +15½
|- align="center" bgcolor="ffbbbb"
| 123 || August 18 || @ Rays || 6–4 || Sonnanstine (13–6) || Garland (11–8) || Wheeler (6) || Tropicana Field || 15,896 || 76–47 || bgcolor="bbffbb" | +15½
|- align="center" bgcolor="ffbbbb"
| 124 || August 19 || @ Rays || 4–2 || Shields (11–7) || Shields (5–4) || Wheeler (7) || Tropicana Field || 15,902 || 76–48 || bgcolor="bbffbb" | +15½
|- align="center" bgcolor="bbffbb"
| 125 || August 20 || @ Rays || 5–4 || Arredondo (5–1) || Balfour (3–2) || Rodríguez (48) || Tropicana Field || 19,157 || 77–48 || bgcolor="bbffbb" | +15½
|- align="center" bgcolor="ffbbbb"
| 126 || August 21 || Twins || 2–1 (12) || Crain (5–2) || Speier (1–7) || Nathan (35) || Angel Stadium of Anaheim || 41,367 || 77–49 || bgcolor="bbffbb" | +15
|- align="center" bgcolor="ffbbbb"
| 127 || August 22 || Twins || 9–0 || Perkins (11–3) || Saunders (14–6) || || Angel Stadium of Anaheim || 43,819 || 77–50 || bgcolor="bbffbb" | +15
|- align="center" bgcolor="bbffbb"
| 128 || August 23 || Twins || 7–5 || Oliver (5–1) || Blackburn (9–8) || Rodríguez (49) || Angel Stadium of Anaheim || 43,906 || 78–50 || bgcolor="bbffbb" | +16
|- align="center" bgcolor="bbffbb"
| 129 || August 24 || Twins || 5–3 || Arredondo (6–1) || Crain (5–3) || Rodríguez (50)|| Angel Stadium of Anaheim || 40,011 || 79–50 || bgcolor="bbffbb" | +17
|- align="center" bgcolor="ffbbbb"
| 130 || August 25 || Athletics || 2–1 || Braden (4–3) || Weaver (10–10) || Ziegler (5) || Angel Stadium of Anaheim || 39,584 || 79–51 || bgcolor="bbffbb" | +16
|- align="center" bgcolor="bbffbb"
| 131 || August 26 || Athletics || 5–1 || Lackey (11–2) || Smith (6–13) || || Angel Stadium of Anaheim || 37,431 || 80–51 || bgcolor="bbffbb" | +16
|- align="center" bgcolor="ffbbbb"
| 132 || August 27 || Athletics || 6–5 || Street (4–5) || Saunders (14–7) || Ziegler (6) || Angel Stadium of Anaheim || 38,587 || 80–52 || bgcolor="bbffbb" | +15
|- align="center" bgcolor="bbffbb"
| 133 || August 28 || Rangers || 7–5 || Garland (12–8) || Wright (6–6) || Rodríguez (51) || Angel Stadium of Anaheim || 37,541 || 81–52 || bgcolor="bbffbb" | +16
|- align="center" bgcolor="bbffbb"
| 134 || August 29 || Rangers || 3–1 || Santana (14–5) || Nippert (1–4) || Rodríguez (52) || Angel Stadium of Anaheim || 40,084 || 82–52 || bgcolor="bbffbb" | +17
|- align="center" bgcolor="bbffbb"
| 135 || August 30 || Rangers || 4–3 || Arredondo (7–1) || Feldman (5–6) || Rodríguez (53) || Angel Stadium of Anaheim || 43,937 || 83–52 || bgcolor="bbffbb" | +18
|- align="center" bgcolor="ffbbbb"
| 136 || August 31 || Rangers || 4–3 || Millwood (9–7) || Lackey (11–3) || Francisco (2) || Angel Stadium of Anaheim || 39,153 || 83–53 || bgcolor="bbffbb" | +17
|-

|- align="center" bgcolor="bbffbb"
| 137 || September 2 || @ Tigers || 5–4 || Shields (6–4) || Rodney (0–4) || Rodríguez (54) || Comerica Park || 35,320 || 84–53 || bgcolor="bbffbb" | +17½
|- align="center" bgcolor="ffbbbb"
| 138 || September 3 || @ Tigers || 9–6 || Farnsworth (2–2) || Arredondo (7–2) || Rodney (8) || Comerica Park || 36,671 || 84–54 || bgcolor="bbffbb" | +16½
|- align="center" bgcolor="bbffbb"
| 139 || September 4 || @ Tigers || 7–1 || Santana (15–5) || Rogers (9–13) || || Comerica Park || 37,890 || 85–54 || bgcolor="bbffbb" | +17
|- align="center" bgcolor="ffbbbb"
| 140 || September 5 || @ White Sox || 10–2 || Buehrle (12–11) || Moseley (1–4) || || U.S. Cellular Field || 32,502 || 85–55 || bgcolor="bbffbb" | +17
|- align="center" bgcolor="ffbbbb"
| 141 || September 6 || @ White Sox || 7–6 (15) || Wassermanm (1–1) || Speier (1–8) || || U.S. Cellular Field || 31,046 || 85–56 || bgcolor="bbffbb" | +16
|- align="center" bgcolor="bbffbb"
| 142 || September 7 || @ White Sox || 3–2 || Saunders (15–7) || H. Ramírez (1–4) || Rodríguez (55) || U.S. Cellular Field || 26,029 || 86–56 || bgcolor="bbffbb" | +17
|- align="center" bgcolor="bbffbb"
| 143 || September 8 || Yankees || 12–1 || Garland (13–8) || Pavano (2–1) || || Angel Stadium of Anaheim || 41,025 || 87–56 || bgcolor="bbffbb" | +17½
|- align="center" bgcolor="ffbbbb"
| 144 || September 9 || Yankees || 7–1 || Aceves (1–0) || Santana (15–6) || || Angel Stadium of Anaheim || 43,042 || 87–57 || bgcolor="bbffbb" | +16½
|- align="center" bgcolor="bbffbb"
| 145 || y-September 10 || Yankees || 4–2 || Moseley (2–4) || Pettitte (13–13) || Rodríguez (56) || Angel Stadium of Anaheim || 39,783 || 88–57 || bgcolor="bbffbb" | +17½
|- align="center" bgcolor="bbffbb"
| 146 || September 11 || Mariners || 7–4 || Weaver (11–10) || Morrow (2–3) || Rodríguez (57) || Angel Stadium of Anaheim || 38,205 || 89–57 || bgcolor="bbffbb" | +17½
|- align="center" bgcolor="bbffbb"
| 147 || September 12 || Mariners || 5–3 || Arredondo (8–2) || Batista (4–13) || || Angel Stadium of Anaheim || 43,743 || 90–57 || bgcolor="bbffbb" | +17½
|- align="center" bgcolor="bbffbb"
| 148 || September 13 || Mariners || 5–2 || Garland (14–8) || Feierabend (1–3) || Rodríguez (58) || Angel Stadium of Anaheim || 43,757 || 91–57 || bgcolor="bbffbb" | +18½
|- align="center" bgcolor="bbffbb"
| 149 || September 14 || Mariners || 4–3 || Arredondo (9–2) || Corcoran (5–1) || || Angel Stadium of Anaheim || 41,528 || 92–57 || bgcolor="bbffbb" | +19½
|- align="center" bgcolor="ffbbbb"
| 150 || September 16 || @ Athletics || 8–1 || Gallagher (5–6) || Lackey (11–4) || || McAfee Coliseum || 14,325 || 92–58 || bgcolor="bbffbb" | +18
|- align="center" bgcolor="ffbbbb"
| 151 || September 17 || @ Athletics || 3–2 || Ziegler (2–0) || Rodríguez (2–3) || || McAfee Coliseum || 20,102 || 92–59 || bgcolor="bbffbb" | +18
|- align="center" bgcolor="bbffbb"
| 152 || September 18 || @ Athletics || 6–4 || Saunders (16–7) || Outman (1–1) || Rodríguez (59) || McAfee Coliseum || 12,645 || 93–59 || bgcolor="bbffbb" | +18½
|- align="center" bgcolor="bbffbb"
| 153 || September 19 || @ Rangers || 15–13 || Oliver (6–1) || Wright (7–7) || Shields (3) || Rangers Ballpark in Arlington || 23,708 || 94–59 || bgcolor="bbffbb" | +19½
|- align="center" bgcolor="bbffbb"
| 154 || September 20 || @ Rangers || 7–3 || Speier (2–8) || Padilla (13–8) || Rodríguez (60) || Rangers Ballpark in Arlington || 38,973 || 95–59 || bgcolor="bbffbb" | +20½
|- align="center" bgcolor="bbffbb"
| 155 || September 21 || @ Rangers || 7–3 || Lackey (12–4) || Feldman (5–8) || || Rangers Ballpark in Arlington || 28,390 || 96–59 || bgcolor="bbffbb" | +21½
|- align="center" bgcolor="bbffbb"
| 156 || September 22 || @ Mariners || 2–1 || Santana (16–6) || Rowland-Smith (4–3) || Rodríguez (61) || Safeco Field || 19,717 || 97–59 || bgcolor="bbffbb" | +22
|- align="center" bgcolor="ffbbbb"
| 157 || September 23 || @ Mariners || 9–6 || Corcoran (6–2) || Jepsen (0–1) || Putz (14) || Safeco Field || 19,065 || 97–60 || bgcolor="bbffbb" | +21½
|- align="center" bgcolor="bbffbb"
| 158 || September 24 || @ Mariners || 6–5 || Oliver (7–1) || Lowe (1–5) || Rodríguez (62) || Safeco Field || 19,015 || 98–60 || bgcolor="bbffbb" | +21½
|- align="center" bgcolor="bbffbb"
| 159 || September 25 || @ Mariners || 6–4 || Arredondo (10–2) || Putz (6–5) || Shields (4) || Safeco Field || 16,939 || 99–60 || bgcolor="bbffbb" | +22
|- align="center" bgcolor="ffbbbb"
| 160 || z-September 26 || Rangers || 12–1 || Padilla (14–8) || Lackey (12–5) || || Angel Stadium of Anaheim || 43,758 || 99–61 || bgcolor="bbffbb" | +21
|- align="center" bgcolor="ffbbbb"
| 161 || September 27 || Rangers || 8–4 || Feldman (6–8) || Santana (16–7) || || Angel Stadium of Anaheim || 43,141 || 99–62 || bgcolor="bbffbb" | +20
|- align="center" bgcolor="bbffbb"
| 162 || September 28 || Rangers || 7–0 || Saunders (17–7) || Millwood (9–10) || || Angel Stadium of Anaheim || 43,761 || 100–62 || bgcolor="bbffbb" | +21
|-

Player stats

Batting

Main hitters
Includes those who qualify for the batting title.
Only includes statistics obtained while playing for LAA. Casey Kotchman was traded to the Atlanta Braves for Mark Teixeira on July 28. 
Note: G = Games played; AB = At bats; H = Hits; Avg. = Batting average; HR = Home runs; RBI = Runs batted in

Other hitters
Note: G = Games played; AB = At bats; H = Hits; Avg. = Batting average; HR = Home runs; RBI = Runs batted in

Note: Pitchers batting data included above

Starting pitchers
Note: GS = Games started; IP = Innings pitched; W = Wins; L = Losses; ERA = Earned run average; SO = Strikeouts

Relief pitchers
Note: G = Games pitched; IP = Innings pitched; W = Wins; L = Losses; SV = Saves; H = Holds; ERA = Earned run average; SO = Strikeouts

Playoffs

Division Series

Game log

|- align="center" bgcolor="ffbbbb"
| 1 || October 1 || Red Sox || 4–1 || Lester (1–0) || Lackey (0–1) || Papelbon (1) || Angel Stadium of Anaheim || 44,996 || 0–1 || 
|- align="center" bgcolor="ffbbbb"  
| 2 || October 3 || Red Sox || 7–5 || Papelbon (1–0) || Rodríguez (0–1) || || Angel Stadium of Anaheim || 43,354 || 0–2 || 
|- align="center" bgcolor="bbffbb" 
| 3 || October 5 || @ Red Sox || 5–4 (12) || Weaver (1–0) || López (0–1) || || Fenway Park || 39,067 || 1–2 || 
|- align="center" bgcolor="ffbbbb" 
| 4 || October 6 || @ Red Sox || 3–2|| Delcarmen (1–0) || Shields (0–1) || || Fenway Park || 38,785 || 1–3 || 
|-

Statistics

Postseason Batting and Pitching Statistics
Note: G = Games played; AB = At bats; H = Hits; Avg. = Batting average; HR = Home runs; RBI = Runs batted in

Starting pitchers
Note: GS = Games Started; IP = Innings pitched; W = Wins; L = Losses; ERA = Earned run average; SO = Strikeouts

Relief pitchers
Note: G = Games pitched; IP = Innings pitched; W = Wins; L = Losses; SV = Saves; H = Holds; ERA = Earned run average; SO = Strikeouts

Farm system

LEAGUE CHAMPIONS: Arkansas

See also

Los Angeles Angels of Anaheim
Angel Stadium of Anaheim
2008 MLB season

Other Anaheim-based teams in 2008
Anaheim Ducks (Honda Center)
 2007–08 Anaheim Ducks season
 2008–09 Anaheim Ducks season

References 

 2008 Los Angeles Angels of Anaheim season at Baseball Reference
 Angels schedule

Los Angeles Angels of Anaheim
American League West champion seasons
Los Angeles Angels seasons
Los